General elections were held in Dominica in May 1947.

Electoral system
The Legislative Council had eleven members; the Administrator as President, two ex officio members, three appointed members and five elected members. The Administrator could vote only to break a tie.

Results

The appointed members were James O. Aird, Clement Joseph Leonard Dupigny and Howell Donald Shillingford.

References

Dominica
1947 in Dominica
Elections in Dominica
Dominica
Election and referendum articles with incomplete results
May 1947 events in North America